Dolobay is one of the woredas in the Somali Region of Ethiopia. Part of the Afder Zone, Dolobay is bordered on the south by the Provisional Administrative Line with Somalia, on the west by the Ganale Dorya River which separates it from the Liben Zone, on the northwest by Cherti, on the north by Afder, and on the east by Bare. The major town in Dolobay is Weldiya.

Other rivers in Dolobay include the Mena, and the seasonal Weyib.

Demographics 
Based on the 2007 Census conducted by the Central Statistical Agency of Ethiopia (CSA), this woreda has a total population of 84,134, of whom 47,014 are men and 37,120 women. While 7,174 or 8.53% are urban inhabitants, a further 39,072 or 46.44% are pastoralists. 99.26% of the population said they were Muslim.
This woreda majority is in inhabited by Faqi Muxumed sub clan of Surre.

Notable People from this town are:

1 ugaas sheik ali ( major clan in the woreda of baydisle clan
2.ugaas Ibrahin Dhaqane(Rukun)
3. Ugaas Garane ) - Faqi Muhamed
4 Suldan: Abdi Omar Nur Gole -  Suldan of the Odomarke sub clan of Gaadsan.

major towns
1 koraley
2- Gubadley
3- Ceel Dhub
4 helkuram
5elhar
6 waldiya

The 1997 national census reported a total population for this woreda of 71,940, of whom 39,891 were men and 32,049 were women; 5,909 or 8.21% of its population were urban dwellers. The largest ethnic group reported in Afder was the dir subclan of surre(fiqi Mohamed) and others like gadsan  Somali people (98.76%).

Notes 

Districts of Somali Region